"Shot You Down" is a song by English electronic music project Audio Bullys featuring vocal samples from American singer Nancy Sinatra from her cover of the 1966 song "Bang Bang (My Baby Shot Me Down)". It became a  3 hit in the United Kingdom in mid-2005 and reached the top 20 in Australia and the Netherlands the same year. Sinatra is credited as being featured on the song (Audio Bullys feat. Nancy Sinatra) since her vocal samples are an integral part of the song. The song is included on the album Generation, released on 31 October 2005.

Track listings
UK CD single
 "Shot You Down" (radio edit) – 2:56
 "I Won't Let You Down" – 4:29

UK 12-inch single
A. "Shot You Down" (original) – 6:49
B. "Shot You Down" (Lee Cabrera "Lower East Side" mix) – 6:40

European and Australian CD single
 "Shot You Down" (radio edit) – 2:56
 "Shot You Down" (full length) – 6:48
 "Shot You Down" (Lee Cabrera "Lower East Side" mix) – 6:46

Charts

Weekly charts

Year-end charts

Certifications

Release history

References

2005 singles
2005 songs
Audio Bullys songs
EMI Records singles
Nancy Sinatra songs
Songs written by Sonny Bono
Virgin Records singles